
Gmina Mrocza is an urban-rural gmina (administrative district) in Nakło County, Kuyavian-Pomeranian Voivodeship, in north-central Poland.

The gmina contains part of the protected area called Krajna Landscape Park.

Villages
Apart from the town of Mrocza, Gmina Mrocza contains the villages and settlements of Białowieża, Chwałka, Dąbrowice, Drążno, Drążonek, Drzewianowo, Izabela, Jadwigowo, Jeziorki Zabartowskie, Kaźmierzewo, Konstantowo, Kosowo, Kozia Góra Krajeńska, Krukówko, Matyldzin, Modrakowo, Orle, Orlinek, Orzelski Młyn, Ostrowo, Podgórz, Rajgród, Rościmin, Samsieczynek, Słupówko, Wiele, Witosław, Wyrza and Zdrogowo.

Neighbouring gminas
Gmina Mrocza is bordered by the gminas of Łobżenica, Nakło nad Notecią, Sadki, Sicienko, Sośno and Więcbork.

References
Polish official population figures 2006

Mrocza
Nakło County